N-n-Propylnorapomorphine (NPA) is an aporphine derivative dopamine agonist closely related to apomorphine. In rodents it has been shown to produce hyperactivity, stereotypy, hypothermia, antinociception, and penile erection, among other effects. Notably, its effects on locomotion are biphasic, with low doses producing inhibition and catalepsy and high doses resulting in enhancement of activity. This is likely due to preferential activation of D2/D3 autoreceptors versus postsynaptic receptors, the latter of which overcomes the former to increase postsynaptic dopaminergic signaling only with high doses.

See also
 Apomorphine

References

Dopamine agonists
Catechols
Dibenzoquinolines